Pink Elephants is Mick Harvey's second collection of Serge Gainsbourg covers, released in 1997.

Critical reception
Entertainment Weekly wrote that "Harvey’s English versions of Gainsbourg songs maintain the latter’s lounge-lizard perversions, hilarious existential angst, and theatrical grandeur." Trouser Press called "I Love You...Nor Do I", the Anita Lane and Nick Cave duet, "erotic" and "the album’s centerpiece."

Track listing
All tracks composed by Serge Gainsbourg; except where indicated
All lyrics translated by Mick Harvey; except where indicated
"Pink Elephants" (Mick Harvey, Bertrand Burgalat) – 2:35
"Requiem. . . (Requiem Pour Un Con)" (Gainsbourg, Michel Colombier; translated by Mick Harvey, Larry Norman and Pierre Gottfried Imhof) – 2:35
"The Javanaise (La Javanaise)" – 2:30
"Black Seaweed (Les Goémons)" (translated by Mick Harvey, Larry Norman and Pierre Gottfried Imhof) – 2:21
"Comic Strip" (lyrics by Bill Soly) – 2:42
"The Ticket Puncher (Le Poinçonneur Des Lilas)" (lyrics by Mick Harvey and Alain Chamberlain) – 2:50
"Non Affair (L'Anamour)" (translated by Mick Harvey, Larry Norman and Pierre Gottfried Imhof) – 2:30
"Scenic Railway" (translated by Mick Harvey, Larry Norman and Pierre Gottfried Imhof)  – 2:52
"To All the Lucky Kids (Aux Enfants De La Chance)" (translated by Mick Harvey, Larry Norman and Pierre Gottfried Imhof) – 3:53
"Anthracite (L'Anthracite)" (translated by Mick Harvey, Larry Norman and Pierre Gottfried Imhof) – 2:20
"Manon" (translated by Mick Harvey, Larry Norman and Pierre Gottfried Imhof) – 2:20
"I Love You...Nor Do I (Je t'aime... moi non plus)" – 4:38
"The Ballad of Melody Nelson (La Ballade de Melody Nelson)" (Gainsbourg, Jean-Claude Vannier; translated by Mick Harvey and Sarah Owen) – 1:56
"Torrey Canyon" (translated by Mick Harvey and Sarah Owen) – 3:12
"Who is 'in' Who is 'Out' (Qui Est 'In' Qui Est 'Out' )" (lyrics by Mick Harvey and Alain Chamberlain) – 3:14
"Hotel Specific (L'Hôtel Particulier)" (Gainsbourg, Jean-Claude Vannier; lyrics by Mick Harvey, Katy Beale and Alain Chamberlain) – 3:42

"Pink Elephants'" is an original composition by Mick Harvey and Bertrand Burgalat.

Personnel
Mick Harvey – vocals, guitar, bass
Anita Lane – vocals on "I Love You...Nor Do I" and "The Ballad of Melody Nelson"
Nick Cave – vocals on "I Love You...Nor Do I"
Chris Hughes – drums
Nick Burton – violin
Steve Bentley-Klein – violin
James Cruickshank – organ, vocals
David McClymont – bass
Loene Carmen – backing vocals on "Torrey Canyon" and "Who Is 'In' Who Is 'Out'"
Monica McMahon – backing vocals on "Torrey Canyon" and "Who Is 'In' Who Is 'Out'"
Abigail Trundle – cello
Bertrand Burgalat – string arrangements
Kiernan Box – accordion on "The Javanaise"
Eleanor Gilchrist – violin
Theresa Whipple – viola
Jeremy Morris – violin
Sarah Beardsley- guitar
Technical
P.A. Taylor - sleeve layout
Katy Beale - photography

References

Mick Harvey albums
1997 albums
Mute Records albums
Albums produced by Tony Cohen
Albums produced by Victor Van Vugt
Serge Gainsbourg tribute albums